The Oath is an American crime drama streaming television series, created by Joe Halpin, that premiered on March 8, 2018, on Crackle. The series stars an ensemble cast, including Ryan Kwanten, Katrina Law and Sean Bean. Its second and final season premiered on February 21, 2019.

Premise
The Oath explores "a world of gangs made up of those sworn to protect and defend and sheds light on corrupt and secret societies that are nearly impossible to join. Only a select few make the cut – but once inside, members will do what they must to protect one another from enemies on the outside and from within their own ranks."

Cast and characters

Main

 Ryan Kwanten as Detective Steve Hammond
 Katrina Law as Officer Karen Beach
 Cory Hardrict as Officer Cole Hammond
 J.J. Soria as Detective Pete Ramos
 Arlen Escarpeta as Officer Damon Byrd (season 1)
 Sean Bean as Tom Hammond (season 1)
 Christina Milian as Officer Christine Parks (season 2)

Recurring

 Elisabeth Röhm as Aria Price
 Robert Gosset as SAC Charles Ryder
 Isaac Keys as G
 Kwame Patterson as Neckbone
 Billy Malone as Frank Albanese
 Sarah Dumont as Kate Miller
 Aaron Abrams as David Shankman
 Linda Purl as Gwenn Hammond
 Matt Gerald as Kilvinski
 Isabel Arraiza as Lourdes
 Michael Malarkey as Sam Foster
 Eve Mauro as Theresa Winters
 J. Anthony Pena as Carl Ortiz
 Markice Moore as Cornell Barnes
 Leona Lewis as Amber Hall (season 2)
 Zulay Henao as Carmen Velasquez (season 2)
 Dilshad Vadsaria as Anaya Gil (season 2)
 Sebastian Zurita as Ricardo Velasquez (season 2)
 Erik King as Pastor Greg (season 2)
 Richard Burgi as Nathan Andrews (season 2)
 Rich Paul as Eli Briggs (season 2)
 Carlos Sanz as Ignacio Velasquez (season 2)
 Kevin Connolly as James Hoke (season 2)

 Gilluis Pérez as EMT Rivera (season 1)

Episodes

Season 1 (2018)

Season 2 (2019)

Production

Development

On April 19, 2017, it was announced that Crackle had given the production a series order for a first season consisting of ten episodes. The show was created and written by Joe Halpin who is also set to serve as the series' showrunner and executive produce alongside Curtis "50 Cent" Jackson, Todd Hoffman, and Dennis Kim. Production companies involved in the series include G-Unit Film & Television Inc. and Storied Media Group. On June 19, 2017, it was reported that Jeff T. Thomas would direct the series' first episode. On November 30, 2017, it was announced that the series would premiere on March 8, 2018.

On April 24, 2018, it was reported that Crackle had renewed the series for a second season. On November 29, 2018, it was reported that the second season would premiere on February 21, 2019.

Casting
In June 2017, it was announced that Sean Bean, Arlen Escarpeta, Ryan Kwanten, and Cory Hardrict had joined the series' main cast. In July 2017, it was announced that Katrina Law, J.J. Soria, Kwame Patterson, Elisabeth Röhm, Linda Purl, Michael Malarkey, and Eve Mauro had been cast as series regulars. It was also announced that month that Sarah Dumont, Billy Malone, Aaron Abrams, Robert Gossett, and Isaac Keys had been cast in recurring roles. On August 30, 2017, it was announced that J. Anthony Pena had joined the series in a recurring capacity. On September 14, 2017, it was announced that Isabel Arraiza had been cast in a recurring role.

On June 27, 2018, it was announced that Christina Milian was joining the cast as a series regular, while Leona Lewis and Zulay Henao were set to appear in a recurring capacity. On July 19, 2018, it was reported that Dilshad Vadsaria, Sebastian Zurita, Erik King, Richard Burgi, Rich Paul, and Carlos Sanz had been cast in recurring roles and that J. Anthony Pena would reprise his role from season one.

Filming
Principal photography for the first season began in July 2017 in Puerto Rico. Filming for season two had reportedly begun by July 2018 in San Juan, Puerto Rico.

Release
On November 30, 2017, a teaser trailer for the series was released. On January 12, 2018, a second trailer was released. On January 10, 2019, a trailer for the second season was released.

References

External links

2010s American crime drama television series
2018 American television series debuts
2019 American television series endings
Crackle (streaming service) original programming
English-language television shows
Television series by Sony Pictures Television
Television series by G-Unit Films and Television Inc.